Ibrahim Rakha is an Egyptian professional footballer who currently plays as an attacking midfielder for the Egyptian club El Raja SC.

References

Living people
El Raja SC players
Egyptian footballers
Association football midfielders
Year of birth missing (living people)